Luehdorfia puziloi is a butterfly of the family Papilionidae. It was described by Nikolay Grigoryevich Erschoff in 1872. It is found in Manchuria, the Russian Far East (Ussuri), North Korea, South Korea, Japan and the Kuriles.

The larvae feed on Asarum sieboldii and Asiasarum species.

Subspecies
Luehdorfia puziloi puziloi (south-eastern Russia)
Luehdorfia puziloi coreana Matsumura, 1927 (Korea)
Luehdorfia puziloi inexpecta Sheljuzhko, 1913 (Japan)
Luehdorfia puziloi jezoensis Matsumura
Luehdorfia puziloi lenzeni Bryk, 1938 (China)
Luehdorfia puziloi lingjangensis Lee, 1982 (China)
Luehdorfia puziloi machimuraorum Fujioka, 2003 (south-eastern Russia)
Luehdorfia puziloi yessoensis Rothschild, 1918 (Japan (Hokkaido))

References

Butterflies described in 1872
Luehdorfia
Butterflies of Asia